Electronic consultation is an aspect of telemedicine which involves remote communication between patients and clinicians, or between clinicians and specialists.

E-consult was one of the earlier applications which primary care physicians could use to consult specialists. Dermatology  lent itself to this approach as pictures could be sent for examination in a specialist centre in a process analogous to the well-established treatment of pathological specimens.  The widespread use of electronic health records is reducing the need for specialist applications of this kind. There is developing interest in the application of such techniques in mental health.  See  remote therapy.

Consultation applications
Getting an appointment with care specialists can be difficult. But electronic consultation has stepped in to provide medical diagnosis or evaluation that can be carried out over the phone from the comfort of your home. Your healthcare provider can easily place a voice or video call to you, engage you with some test questions, analyze symptoms of ailments, treat and manage them. Improved technology has made electronic consultation easier, even for those who don't consider themselves computer savvy. You can use electronic consultation through online platforms or mobile apps and request a virtual visit with doctors, practitioners, and therapists.

The patient arranges an interview, generally by video, with a clinician, generally a general practitioner:
American Well
CloudVisit Telemedicine
Doc+
Dr Fox Pharmacy
eConsult
E-med
GP at Hand
HealthLinkBC
LIVI
Ontario Telemedicine Network
Push Doctor
Teladoc
Zocdoc
ZEBOC

See also: Online doctor

Symptom checkers
These let patients enter their symptoms into an application. A report may be generated and sent to a clinician. Triaging applications, such as used by NHS 111 advise on the urgency of the problem. 
Ada Health 
Infermedica
WebMD
Your.MD

References

Telemedicine